In basketball, an air ball is an unblocked shot that misses the basket, rim and backboard entirely.

Origin
The Oxford English Dictionary cites earliest printed use of "air ball" in a 29 January 1967 article from the (Hayward, Calif.) Daily Review, which reads: "Cal State, four times lofting air balls at an orange basket that may as well have been painted invisible."  

An air ball by an opposing player during a competitive game will usually prompt fans (primarily in the college game) present to chant “Aiiiir ball! Aiir ball!” repeatedly in a continuous drone to humiliate the shooter. Since the 1980s, it has become common to restart the chant the next time the shooter touches the ball.

Crowd behavior and consequences 
In collegiate basketball, home crowds were found to initially chant when the air ball shot was made from a distance and when it resulted in a lost possession. Home crowds were also more persistent in their chants when the shot was made farther from the basket. An archival exploration showed that away players who shot an air ball had a lower success rate in the shot immediately after, as compared to home players launching the same shot; however, this difference was unrelated to the chant.

See also
Brick (basketball)

References

Basketball terminology

pl:Błędy w koszykówce#Air ball